Araidanga is a populated place, not identified as a separate place in 2011 census, in the Ratua II CD block in the Chanchal subdivision of Malda district in the state of West Bengal, India.

Geography

Location                            

Araidanga is a gram panchayat.

Area overview
The area shown in the adjacent map covers two physiographic regions – the Barind in the east and the tal in the west. The eastern part is comparatively high (up to 40 metres above mean sea level at places) and uneven. The soils of the eastern region are “hard salty clays of a reddish hue and the ground is baked hard as iron.” It lies to the east of the Mahananda River. The area lying to the west of the Mahananda River, the tal, is a flat low land and “is strewn with innumerable marshes, bils and oxbow lakes.” The tal area is prone to flooding by local rivers. The total area is overwhelmingly rural. There are two important historical/ archaeological sites in the area – Pandua and Jagjivanpur.

Note: The map alongside presents some of the notable locations in the area. All places marked in the map are linked in the larger full screen map.

Education
Araidanga DBM Academy is a Bengali-medium coeducational institution established in 1865. It has facilities for teaching from class V to class XII. It has a playground, a library with 361 books, and 15 computers for teaching and learning purposes.

Healthcare
Araidanga Rural Hospital, with 30 beds, is the main government medical facility in Ratua II CD block.

See also
 Araidanga (Vidhan Sabha constituency)

References	

Villages in Malda district